Gypsy Heart may refer to:

Music
Gypsy Heart Tour,  Miley Cyrus, 2011

Albums
Gypsy Heart (Cobie Caillat album), 2014
Gypsy Heart, by Ashik on New Earth Records, 2013  
Gypsy Heart, by Playmen & Hadley, 2013 
Srce Cigansko (Gypsy Heart) Boban Marković,  2000

Songs
"(I Love Your) Gypsy Heart", by Peggy Lee from If You Go, 1961
"Gypsy Heart", by Bobby Curtola, 1963
"Gypsy Heart", song by Elton John from Leather Jackets (album) 1986
"Gypsy Heart", song by the Red Elvises from I Wanna See You Bellydance, 1998
"Cygańskie serce" (Polish: "Gypsy Heart"), song by Edyta Górniak
"Gitano Corazón" (Spanish: "Gypsy Heart"), song by Natalia Oreiro from Tu Veneno, 2000
"Cigansko srce" (Serbian: "Gypsy Heart"), song by the Serbian rock band Smak from Delfin (EP)